Javier Rivera Aquino, an agronomist and farmer, and former Secretary of Agriculture of Puerto Rico, appointed by Governor Luis Fortuño and sworn in by Secretary of State Kenneth McClintock on January 2, 2009.  In December, 2011 he announced that he would resign his office on the third anniversary of his swearing in, January 7, 2011, in order to spend more time with his family, which resides in Lares, a grueling two-and-a-half-hour one-way commute from the Department's offices in San Juan.

A former member of the Puerto Rico House of Representatives from 2005 to 2009, representing the towns of Utuado, Adjuntas, Jayuya and Lares, Rivera Aquino has Bachelors of Science in Agriculture Soil Science from Ohio State University agronomist who owns and operated a farm in Lares.

References

Members of the 15th Cabinet of Puerto Rico
New Progressive Party members of the House of Representatives of Puerto Rico
Ohio State University College of Food, Agricultural, and Environmental Sciences alumni
Puerto Rican people of Spanish descent
People from Lares, Puerto Rico
Secretaries of Agriculture of Puerto Rico
Living people
Year of birth missing (living people)